Lochend may refer to the following places:

Scotland
 Lochend, Edinburgh, a suburb of Edinburgh, named after 
 Lochend House, an occupied house containing the remnants of a 16th-century castle
 Lochend Loch (Edinburgh), a small lake near Lochend House in Lochend, Edinburgh
 Lochend Park, a public park in Edinburgh
 Lochend, Glasgow, a neighbourhood in the Glasgow suburb of Easterhouse
 Lochend Community High School in Easterhouse, Glasgow
 Lochend Castle, Campbeltown, a former castle at Campbeltown, Argyll and Bute
 Lochend (Loch Ness), a hamlet on the northern shore of Loch Ness
 Lochend Loch (Coylton), a small lake in Ayrshire

 Lochend Loch in Drumpellier Country Park, Lanarkshire
 Lochend Woods, Dunbar, East Lothian

Other countries
 Lochend Colliery, a former mine near Newcastle, New South Wales, Australia
 Lochend House, Campbelltown, an historic home in Adelaide, South Australia
 Lochend Road, Alberta, Canada

See also
 Baillie baronets, of Lochend (1636)
 Lochend Church and Farm, in Beeswing, Dumfries and Galloway, Scotland
 Warrender baronets, of Lochend (1715)